Zhang Yu  is a mainland Chinese film actress. Zhang is the first actress to win both the Golden Rooster Award and the Hundred Flowers Award for Best Actress, for Romance on Lushan Mountain. She was nominated for the Hundred Flowers Award for Best Actress and the Huabiao Award for Outstanding Actress for Ren Changxia (2005).

Filmography
Youth (1977)
A! Yaolan (1979)
Romance on Lushan Mountain (1980)
Evening Rain (1980)
Little Street (1981)
Ren Changxia (2005)

Awards and nominations

References

External links

1957 births
Living people
Actresses from Shanghai
Chinese television actresses
Chinese film actresses
20th-century Chinese actresses
21st-century Chinese actresses
Chinese emigrants to the United States